The Faroese Literature Prize, also known as the Mentanarvirðisløn M. A. Jacobsens (M. A. Jacobsen's Cultural Award), is a prize for Faroese literature that was begun by the Tórshavnar kommuna (Tórshavn City Council) in 1958. Its winners include Heðin Brú, Jákup Pauli Gregoriussen, Jóanes Nielsen and Kristian Blak. The prize is always awarded at a ceremony in Tórshavn on 17 September or a day close to 17 September, which is the birthday of Mads Andreas Jacobsen. M. A. Jacobsen was a Faroese politician and librarian who headed the National Library of the Faroe Islands, then called Færø Amts Bibliotek in Danish but later renamed Landsbókasavnið, in Faroese. M. A. Jacobsen was the mayor of Tórshavn and a member of the Løgting (the Faroese parliament). The M. A. Jacobsen Prize was at first only for writers, but was later expanded to three categories: one award for Faroese fiction, one for Faroese nonfiction and one for other cultural achievements. In 2012 the prize was worth 35,000 Danish kroner.

Another Faroese cultural prize, called Mentanarvirðisløn Landsins (Faroese Cultural Prize), is currently worth 150,000 DKK. In addition the Heiðursgáva landsins (The Faroese Cultural Department's Award of Honour)  is worth 75,000 DKK.

List of Faroese Literature Prize winners

M.A. Jacobsens's Awards Before 1969

References 

Faroese literature
Faroese literary awards
Awards established in 1958
Autumn events in the Faroe Islands